Robin Guitars was a boutique manufacturing company that produced electric guitars. The company was located in Houston, Texas.

History 
The company was formed in 1982 by John "Bart" Wittrock and Dave Wintz who owned the Rockin' Robin Guitar Shop at the time. Robin guitars were made in Japan by Tokai and Chushin until 1986, when their production moved to the United States. Notable endorsers include Stevie Ray Vaughan and his brother Jimmie, who were frequently seen onstage with the "RDN" 6-string standard neck/6 string octave neck double-neck guitar in the 1980s. Eric Johnson has played them, and Stevie Blaze of Lillian Axe also played Robin guitars during the early part of his career. Robin guitars and basses have featured pickups from their sister company, Rio Grande Pickups since 1994.

Notable users
Stevie Ray Vaughan
Jimmie Vaughan
Tim Kelly
Eric Johnson
Steve Blaze
J. Yuenger

References

External links
Official website
Rio Grande Pickups, sister company to Robin Guitars 

Guitar manufacturing companies of the United States
Manufacturing companies based in Houston
Companies established in 1982
1982 establishments in Texas